Shag, or Shagged, or Shagger, or Shagging, or Shags  may refer to:

Animals
 Shag or cormorant, a bird family
 European shag, a specific species of the shag or cormorant family
 Great cormorant another species of the family

People

Pseudonym
 Shag (artist), stage name of the American artist Josh Agle (born 1962)
 Shag, a name used on some pop records in the early 1970s by British record producer Jonathan King
 Shags Horan (1895-1969), American baseball player

Name
 Shag (name)
Shag Thomas (1924–1982), American professional wrestler
Avraham-Haim Shag (1883–1958), Israeli politician

Arts, entertainment, and media

Music
 The Shag, also known as The Shags (one of many bands of that name) or Shag, a 1960s garage and psychedelic rock band from Milwaukee
 The Shags (Connecticut band), a 1960s rock band from Connecticut

Dance
 Carolina shag, a swing dance that originated in South Carolina in the 1940s and still is their state dance
 Collegiate shag, a swing dance that originated in the 1920s (popular in the 1930s and 40s)
 St. Louis shag, a swing dance that evolved from the Charleston

Other uses in arts, entertainment, and media
 Shag (film), a 1989 film
 Shag, a fictitious character from Road Rovers

Other uses
 Shag (fabric), a fabric typically used to make deep-pile carpets
 Shag (hairstyle)
 Shag (tobacco), fine-cut tobacco
 Shag, a British slang term for sexual intercourse
 Shag, a party and fundraiser for an engaged couple, also known as a stag and doe 
 Shagger (bruise), a temporary bruise caused by kissing, sucking, or biting the skin forcefully enough to burst blood vessels beneath the skin
 Shagging (baseball), to catch fly balls in baseball outside a game
 Ball shagger or shag, fabric for the cleaning of golf balls

See also 
 Shag Island (disambiguation)
 Shag Rocks (disambiguation)
 Shaggy (disambiguation)
 The Shaggs